TNZ can refer to:
 tinidazole, an anti-parasitic drug
 the thermal neutral zone, the temperature range that a warm-blooded organism can tolerate
 the country Tanzania
 the Ten'edn language spoken in Thailand and Malaysia
 Ti–13Nb–13Zr, a metal that is an alloy of titanium, niobium, and zirconium
 Transit New Zealand, a former New Zealand government agency
 Team New Zealand, in some sports events
 Team New Zealand of yachting